West FM is a commercial radio station in regional Queensland, Australia. Owned and operated by Resonate Broadcasting, the station commenced broadcasting to Longreach on 26 June 1997, expanding to Charleville in 2016, and Charters Towers in 2017.

History

West FM commenced broadcasting in Longreach after sister station 4LG was granted a secondary FM licence. On 27 July 1999, Triple C FM commenced broadcasting to Charleville, a sister station to 4VL. Both Triple C and 4VL would later be sold to the Smart Radio Group, and in 2011 to the Macquarie Radio Network. Following the sale of Macquarie's Queensland assets to Resonate Broadcasting, in 2016 Triple C FM rebranded as West FM and commenced sharing programming with the Longreach station of the same name.

Also in 1997, 4GC Charters Towers was too granted a secondary licence, which launched on 13 October as Hot FM. In 2008, following the acquisition of Southern Cross Broadcasting's television assets, owners Macquarie Regional RadioWorks were made to divest the station to Resonate Broadcasting. Despite this, the station continued to share programming with Hot FM Mount Isa - later hit102.5 - until 2017, when Resonate Broadcasting rebranded the station as West FM alongside the Longreach and Charleville stations.

Transmitters
West FM programming is broadcast via three full power stations.

The three full power stations feed a further seven repeater stations.

References

External links
 Triple C FM website

Radio stations in Queensland
Radio stations established in 1999
Adult contemporary radio stations in Australia
Resonate Broadcasting
1999 establishments in Australia